Vladimir Miljković (born 1 July 1984) is a retired Serbian football midfielder.

References

External links
 
 Vladimir Miljković stats at footballdatabase.eu

1984 births
Living people
People from Vranje
Association football midfielders
Serbian footballers
FK Jedinstvo Ub players
FK Bežanija players
FK Radnički Obrenovac players
FK Napredak Kruševac players
FK Srem players
FK Voždovac players
FK Zemun players
FK Modriča players
FK Dečić players
Serbian SuperLiga players
Montenegrin First League players